Chandrapur, is a village in Rahata taluka of Ahmednagar district in the Indian state of Maharashtra. It is located in south-west part of Rahata taluka and borders with Sangamner taluka.

Population
The population of Chandrapur village is 1154 as of the 2011 census. 598 are males and 556 are females.

Economy
Most of the people are engaged in agriculture and some are working in Market town Loni.

Transport

Road
Loni-Sangamner Road passes from village which connects Sangamner, Loni and Shrirampur.

See also
List of villages in Rahata taluka

References 

Villages in Ahmednagar district